Meygret is a surname. Notable people with the surname include:

Anne Meygret (born 1965), French fencer
Gisèle Meygret (1963–1999), French fencer